Hypsidracon saurodoxa is a species of moth of the family Tortricidae. It is found in the Democratic Republic of Congo.

References

Moths described in 1934
Olethreutinae